CFR Title 23 - Highways is one of fifty titles comprising the United States Code of Federal Regulations (CFR), containing the principal set of rules and regulations issued by federal agencies regarding highways. It is available in digital and printed form, and can be referenced online using the Electronic Code of Federal Regulations (e-CFR).

Structure 

The table of contents, as reflected in the e-CFR is as follows:

See also
Title 23 of the United States Code

References

 23